is a Japanese kickboxer, currently competing in the featherweight division of K-1.

As of September 2022 he was the #10 ranked Super Flyweight kickboxer in the world by Combat Press.

Kickboxing career
Terada made his professional debut against Michitaka Uchida at KHAOS 10 on April 4, 2020. He won the fight by unanimous decision, with two scorecards of 30–27 and one scorecard of 30–26. Terada scored the sole knockdown of the fight, as he dropped Uchida with a head kick. Terada made his K-1 debut against Hirotaka Sadamatsu at K-1 World GP 2020 in Fukuoka on November 3, 2020. He won the fight by a first-round knockout, flooring Sadamatsu with a right cross at the 2:06 minute mark of the opening round.

Terada faced the former ACCEL bantamweight champion Naoki Takahashi at K-1 World GP 2021 in Fukuoka on July 17, 2021, in his first fight of the year. He won the fight by a close unanimous decision, with all three judges scoring the fight 30–29 in his favor. Terada was next booked to face Yuta Matsuyama at Krush 132 on December 18, 2021. He won the fight by a first-round knockout.

Terada faced Rei Inagaki at Krush 137 on May 21, 2022. The pair previously fought as amateurs on December 21, 2019, with Inagaki winning by majority decision. Terada was more successful in their second meeting, as he won the fight by unanimous decision, with scores of 30–27, 30–26 and 29–27. He knocked Inagaki down with a right hook in the first round.

Terada faced Ginji in the reserve bout of the 2022 K-1 Featherweight World Grand Prix, which was held at K-1 World GP 2022 in Fukuoka on August 11, 2022. He won the fight by unanimous decision, with two judges scoring the bout 30–27 for him, while the third judge scored it 30–28 in his favor.

Titles and accomplishments

Awards
 2021 K-1 Awards Rookie of the Year

Fight record

|-  style="background:#cfc"
| 2022-08-11|| Win||align=left| Ginji ||  K-1 World GP 2022 in Fukuoka, Tournament Reserve || Fukuoka, Japan || Decision (Unanimous) || 3 ||3:00
|-
|-  style="text-align:center; background:#cfc;"
| 2022-05-21|| Win ||align=left| Rei Inagaki|| Krush 137 || Tokyo, Japan || Decision (Unanimous)|| 3 || 3:00

|-  style="text-align:center; background:#cfc"
| 2021-12-18 || Win || align=left| Yuta Matsuyama || Krush 132 || Tokyo, Japan || KO (Left hook) || 1 ||2:22

|-  style="text-align:center; background:#cfc;"
| 2021-07-17 || Win || align=left| Naoki Takahashi ||  K-1 World GP 2021 in Fukuoka || Fukuoka, Japan || Decision (unanimous)|| 3||3:00

|- style="background:#cfc;"
| 2020-11-03|| Win ||align=left| Hirotaka Sadamatsu || K-1 World GP 2020 in Fukuoka || Fukuoka, Japan || KO (Right Cross)  || 1 ||2:06

|-  style="text-align:center; background:#cfc;"
| 2020-04-04 || Win || align=left| Michitaka Uchida ||  KHAOS 10 || Tokyo, Japan || Decision (unanimous)|| 3||3:00 
|-
| colspan=9 | Legend:    

|-  style="text-align:center; background:#CCFFCC;"
| 2020-01-18|| Win || align=left| Satoshi Tanaka || Kakutou Dairi Sensou K-1 Final War|| Tokyo, Japan || Decision (unanimous) || 2 ||3:00

|-  style="text-align:center; background:#fbb;"
| 2019-12-21|| Loss || align=left| Rei Inagaki || Kakutou Dairi Sensou K-1 Final War|| Tokyo, Japan || Decision (Majority) || 2 ||3:00

|-  style="text-align:center; background:#CCFFCC;"
| 2019-12-21|| Win || align=left| Keima Ozaki || Kakutou Dairi Sensou K-1 Final War|| Tokyo, Japan || Decision (Unanimous) || 2 ||3:00

|-  style="text-align:center; background:#CCFFCC;"
| 2018-06-13|| Win || align=left| Kohei Kubota || THE OUTSIDER 52 || Fukuoka, Japan || KO || 1 ||2:45
|-
| colspan=9 | Legend:

See also
List of male kickboxers

References

Living people
2000 births
Japanese male kickboxers
Sportspeople from Miyazaki Prefecture